Young Buckethead Vol. 2 is a DVD made by Buckethead and released in 2006 by Jas Obrecht's label, Avabella.

Vol. 2 includes two complete Deli Creeps concerts in San Francisco, unrehearsed backstage footage, and a rare Buckethead interview in a park. Saucy Patches appeared in one concert (9/1/90), before being replaced by Tony Black in the other concert (4/3/91).

DVD contents
Deli Creeps at the I-Beam - 9/1/90
Deli Creeps backstage - 9/1/90
Deli Creeps at the Kennel Club - 4/3/91
Buckethead in the Park - 12/29/90

See also

 Buckethead
 Maximum Bob
 Pinchface

References

External links
 Avabella's official Young Buckethead site

Buckethead video albums
2006 live albums
2006 video albums
Live video albums